Mezőkövesd Subregion Borsod-Abaúj-Zemplén fifth largest of the subregions of Hungary. Area : 679,66 km². Population : 43 664 (2009)

Settlements:

 Bogács
 Borsodgeszt
 Borsodivánka
 Bükkábrány
 Bükkzsérc
 Cserépfalu
 Cserépváralja
 Csincse
 Egerlövő
 Kács
 Mezőkeresztes
 Mezőkövesd
 Mezőnagymihály
 Mezőnyárád
 Négyes
 Sály
 Szentistván
 Szomolya
 Tard
 Tibolddaróc
 Vatta

See also
Mezőkövesd District (from 2013)

References 

Subregions of Hungary